Kristýna Kyněrová (born 3 February 1979 in Znojmo, Jihomoravský) is a retired female freestyle swimmer from the Czech Republic. She twice competed for her native country at the Summer Olympics: in 1996 and 2004.

References

1979 births
Living people
Czech female swimmers
Czech female freestyle swimmers
Swimmers at the 1996 Summer Olympics
Swimmers at the 2004 Summer Olympics
Olympic swimmers of the Czech Republic
People from Znojmo
Sportspeople from the South Moravian Region